"How Do You Fall in Love" is a song written Randy Owen, Teddy Gentry and Greg Fowler, and recorded by American country music group Alabama.  It was released in August 1998 as the first single from their compilation album  For the Record.  It peaked at number 2 in the United States, and number 9 in Canada.

Critical reception
Deborah Evans Price, of Billboard magazine reviewed the song favorably, calling it a "beautiful ballad, ripe with simple, universal truths about the mercurial nature of love and relationships." She goes on to say that Owen's "endearing vocal performance is as warm and comfortable as wrapping yourself in a favorite blanket."

Music video
The music video was directed by Brent Hedgecock, and features the band singing the song in the rain.

Chart performance
"How Do You Fall in Love" debuted at number 57 on the U.S. Billboard Hot Country Singles & Tracks for the week of August 1, 1998.

Year-end charts

References

1998 singles
1998 songs
Alabama (American band) songs
Song recordings produced by Don Cook
Songs written by Randy Owen
Songs written by Teddy Gentry
Songs written by Greg Fowler
RCA Records singles